is a railway station in Tagawa, Fukuoka Prefecture, Japan. It is on the Ita Line, operated by the Heisei Chikuhō Railway. Trains arrive roughly every 30 minutes.

As the name suggests, this station is located near the Tagawa Municipal Hospital. A shuttle transports passengers between the hospital and the station.

Platforms

External links
Tagawa Municipal Hospital Station (Heisei Chikuhō Railway website)

References

Railway stations in Fukuoka Prefecture
Railway stations in Japan opened in 1999
Heisei Chikuhō Railway Ita Line